César Domboy (born 10 March 1990) is a French actor best known for The Walk and his recurring role as Fergus Claudel Fraser in the Starz television drama Outlander.

Early life 
Domboy was born on 10 March 1990 in France, the middle of three children born to his family. He did not attend formal drama school; instead he received private lessons from actress and drama coach Laurence Le Dantec, who has taught theatre for more than fifteen years. In addition to Domboy, her students include Nils Hugon and Gaspard Ulliel.

Career 
Domboy's first professional role, at age fourteen in 2004, was director Étienne Chatiliez's feature-length comedy Just Trust (La Confiance Règne), opposite Vincent Lindon. The next year, he was featured in France 3's made-for-TV film Let's Go Small Children (Allons Petits Enfants), a war drama which centered on a young boy who was attempting to restore his family's honor after his father deserted. Raspail Production's thriller Red Needles (Les Aiguilles Rouges), about a group of boys lost on a hike near Brévent Lake, saw Domboy in the role of Guy. His next role was as Ferdinand in an episode of France 2's television mini-series The Pasquier Clan (Le Clan Pasquier), a family drama set against the backdrop of early Twentieth Century France. From there he returned to feature films in François Desagnat's 2008 adaptation of Vincent Ravalec's novel Daddy Cool (15 Ans et Demi).

In 2009, Domboy starred in Canal+'s Écrire Pour un Chanteur in an episode entitled "Three Celestial Bodies (Les Astres Noirs)", opposite Julien Doré and Paul Schmitt. His next film, Bus Palladium, a dramatic comedy from director Christopher Thompson, featured Domboy as a member of the band Lust as they pursued their musical aspirations. That same year saw him feature in Bertrand Tavernier's drama The Princess of Montpensier, an adaptation of Madame de Lafayette's 1622 novella of the same name.

Domboy went on to star in director Michaël Dacheux's 2011 film On the Go (Sur le Départ), a drama revolving around the lives of two young men who meet in their hometown regularly. In the series five episode "Vue sur Internet" of France 3's dramatic comedy Familie D'accueli(2012), Domboy portrayed guest character Stan. That same year he featured in the YouTube mini-series En Passant Pécho and starred as Guy de Laval in series two of the TV series Borgia, opposite Mark Ryder. He also featured in Bénédicte Pagnot's political activism based film Les Lendemains and Stefan Liberski's feature length dramatic comedy Baby Balloon. In 2014, Domboy co-starred in Week-ends, a drama based on the lives of two couples as told through what occurred during their weekends. He was then cast as The Kid in TF1's drama Résistance, which was loosely based on the activities of the Groupe du musée de l'Homme, which operated as part of the French Resistance in World War II.

2015 saw Domboy star in Les Invisibles, a short film that followed a young man as he started work in the nuclear industry among the "invisible" workers. He finished out the year by co-starring in director Robert Zemeckis' feature film The Walk, based upon the real-life story of Philippe Petit's high wire walk between the World Trade Center towers. He next featured in the romantic comedy Up For Love (Un Homme À La Hauteur) and director Christian Duguay's A Bag of Marbles (Un Sac de Billes), the story of two Jewish boys caught in occupied France during World War II. In 2017, Domboy debuted in the recurring role of Fergus Claudel Fraser, opposite Lauren Lyle's Marsali MacKimmie Fraser, in Starz's hit time travel drama Outlander, based upon Diana Gabaldon's best-selling book series of the same name.

Domboy is set to feature in two feature films in 2021, Eugénie Grandet, based upon the novel of the same name by Honoré de Balzac, and The Mad Woman's Ball (Le Bal des folles), based upon the novel by Victoria Mas. In July it was announced that he would be joining the cast of BBC's upcoming series SAS: Rogue Heroes as Augustin Jordan, a six part drama based upon Ben Macintyre's book of the same name.

Filmography

Television

Film

References

External links 
 

1990 births
Living people
French male film actors
French male television actors
Place of birth missing (living people)
20th-century French male actors
21st-century French male actors